Chaetona is a genus of bristle flies in the family Tachinidae.They are diurnal. Chaetona is classified into seven(7) namely: Chaetona congrua Wulp 189, Chaetona cruenta Giglio-Tos 1893, Chaetona icterica (Wiedemann 1830), Chaetona longiseta (Wiedemann 1830), Chaetona pictilis Reinhard 1975, Chaetona piliseta (Wulp 1890), Chaetona tuchucheensis Thompson 1968

Species
Chaetona congrua Wulp, 1891
Chaetona cruenta Giglio-Tos, 1893
Chaetona icterica (Wiedemann, 1830)
Chaetona longiseta (Wiedemann, 1830)
Chaetona pictilis Reinhard, 1975
Chaetona piliseta (Wulp, 1890)
Chaetona tuchucheensis Thompson, 1968

References

Exoristinae
Taxa named by Frederik Maurits van der Wulp
Tachinidae genera
Diptera of North America
Diptera of South America